Carex luzulina is a species of sedge known by the common name woodrush sedge.

Distribution
This sedge is native to western North America from British Columbia to California to Wyoming, where it grows in wet habitat such as bogs and mountain meadows.

Description
Carex luzulina produces loose to dense clumps of rhizomed stems approaching 90 centimeters in maximum height. The inflorescence is made up of a few spikes of flowers with dark colored scales. The fruit is coated in a sac called a perigynium which is generally greenish with some dark purple coloration.

Varieties
Carex luzulina var. ablata
Carex luzulina var. atropurpurea
Carex luzulina var. luzulina

See also
Luzula - "Woodrush"
Luzula comosa
Luzula divaricata
Luzula orestera

External links
Calflora Database: Carex luzulina (wood rush sedge)
Jepson Manual eFlora (TJM2) treatment of Carex luzulina and varieties
USDA Plants Profile: Carex luzulina
Flora of North America
UC Photos gallery — Carex luzulina

luzulina
Flora of the Northwestern United States
Flora of British Columbia
Flora of California
Flora of Nevada
Flora of Utah
Flora of the Sierra Nevada (United States)
Natural history of the California Coast Ranges
Plants described in 1868
Taxa named by Stephen Thayer Olney
Flora without expected TNC conservation status